Rosbank (Russian: Росбанк) is a Russian universal bank. In October 2020, Rosbank ranked 11th among Russian banks in terms of assets (RUB 1379 billion). According to Forbes Russia, Rosbank was the third most reliable Russian bank in 2021.

Legally, Rosbank is registered as a public joint-stock company (PJSC) and headquartered in Moscow. On 1 July 2011 Rosbank merged with another Russian subsidiary of Société Générale, Banque Société Générale Vostok (BSGV). Starting from April 2022, its majority shareholder has been Interros, after Société Générale has left Russian market due to the international sanctions following the 2022 Russian invasion of Ukraine.

History 

Founded in 1993 under the name of AKB Nezavisimost (Independence), the legal status of the bank has evolved several times (1994: TOO, 1996: ZAO). In September 1998, Interros holding company bought the bank and renamed it to Joint Commercial Bank (JCB) "Rosbank". In 1999 the bank's legal status changed to Open Joint Stock Company (OJSC).

On 21 November 2000, the Vladimir Potanin and Mikhail Prokhorov associated bank ONEKSIMbank (akas: Uneximbank; Onexim Bank; Oneksimbank) merged with Rosbank.

In 2006 Société Générale acquired 20% of Rosbank with an option to purchase an additional package of 30% +2 shares for US$1.7 billion till the end of 2008. This option was exercised in February 2008.

Merger with BSGV and rebranding 
In February 2010 shareholders of Rosbank agreed to consolidate Société Générale assets in Russia, Rosbank, Bank Société Générale Vostok (BSGV) and two other entities: DeltaCredit and Rusfinance Bank. In January 2011 DeltaCredit and Rusfinance became 100% subsidiaries of Rosbank.

On 1 July 2019, DeltaCredit mortgage bank ceased to be an independent bank and became part of Rosbank as a division called "Rosbank Home" (Росбанк Дом). 1 March 2021 in the Rosbank was included Rusfinance, the Russian leader in the car loan segment. It turned into a division of Rosbank under the name "Rosbank Auto".

Resale to Interros 
In the spring of 2022, Société Générale decided to leave the Russian market due to the international sanctions following the 2022 Russian invasion of Ukraine. On 18 May, the deal on the sale of Rosbank to the Interros group was closed. The amount of the transaction was estimated at 0.2-0.3 of the bank's capital (40-60 billion rubles).

In September 2022, Interros owner Vladimir Potanin announced his intention to transfer 50% of Rosbank's shares to his own charitable foundation. Another 7.5% of the shares were sold to a subsidiary of Rosbank - the investment company Rusfinance. It is assumed that these shares will be indirectly used to motivate Rosbank employees within the framework of Potanin's concept of "people's capitalism".

Shareholders 
Until May 2022, Société Générale was the owner of 99.4867% stake, after which they were sold back to Interros. In the fall of 2022, Potanin announced the transfer of 50% of the shares to Charitable Foundation of Vladimir Potanin. Another 7.5% were sold to Rusfinance.

On 15 December 2022, the US Treasury added Potanin and Rosbank to its sanction list.

Regional network 
In order to coordinate the bank's regional network, the management is organized as follows:
 Head office in Moscow
 Seven regional branches (Moscow, Saint Petersburg, Nizhny Novgorod, Yekaterinburg, Rostov-on-Don, Krasnoyarsk, Vladivostok,)
 Operational offices

See also

 Interros
 Vladimir Potanin

References

External links
Official website 

Banks of Russia
Companies based in Moscow
Banks established in 1993
Companies listed on the Moscow Exchange
Société Générale
Vladimir Potanin
Mikhail Prokhorov